Dyella ginsengisoli is a Gram-negative, aerobic, rod-shaped non-spore-forming and motile bacterium from the genus of Dyella which has been isolated from soil from a ginseng field from Pocheon in Korea.

References

Xanthomonadales
Bacteria described in 2009